Michel Vatrican (born 16 July 1969) is a Monegasque bobsledder. He competed in the two man and the four man events at the 1992 Winter Olympics.

References

External links
 

1969 births
Living people
Monegasque male bobsledders
Olympic bobsledders of Monaco
Bobsledders at the 1992 Winter Olympics
People from Monte Carlo